John Charles Wilmot, 1st Baron Wilmot of Selmeston PC (2 April 1893 – 22 July 1964) was a British Labour Party politician. He served under Clement Attlee as Minister of Aircraft Production from 1945 to 1946 and as Minister of Supply from 1945 to 1947.

Education
Wilmot was educated at Hither Green central school, and went on to pursue evening classes at Chelsea Polytechnic and at King's College London.

Political career

He was elected as Member of Parliament (MP) for Fulham East at a by-election in 1933, but lost his seat at the 1935 general election. His victory in the Conservative-held seat at the by-election was something of a surprise. A correspondent reporting the result in The Glasgow Herald described his victory as "an unpleasant surprise", noting that while it was not expected that his Conservative opponent would hold the seat with "a large majority, there was a confident hope that he at least would win through. Certainly a Labour majority of 4840 was not in the picture." The same report argued various factors as bringing about his victory including apathy of Conservative and Liberal voters compared to the strong support he received from Labour electors. The report also argued that Germany's withdrawal from the League of Nations and the World Disarmament Conference had caused a "War scare" which Wilmot's supporters fully exploited to win votes, particularly from female voters in the constituency.

Wilmot was elected as an alderman of London County Council in November 1937, remaining a member until 1945. He returned to the House of Commons at another by-election, in 1939 as MP for Kennington. Wilmot was re-elected to Parliament at the 1945 election for the Deptford constituency, and served in Clement Attlee's post-war government as Minister of Aircraft Production from 1945 to 1946, when that office was abolished, and as Minister of Supply from 1945 to 1947. He was admitted to the Privy Council in 1945. He retired from the House of Commons at the 1950 general election and was raised to the peerage as Baron Wilmot of Selmeston, of Selmeston in the County of Sussex, on 30 January 1950.

Personal life
Lord Wilmot of Selmeston died on 22 July 1964, aged 71.

References

External links 
 
 

Wilmot, John Charles
Wilmot, John Charles
Wilmot, John Charles
Articles containing video clips
Wilmot, John Charles
Labour Party (UK) hereditary peers
Members of London County Council
Wilmot, John Charles
Ministers in the Churchill wartime government, 1940–1945
Ministers of Supply
Wilmot, John Charles
Wilmot, John Charles
Wilmot, John Charles
UK MPs who were granted peerages
Ministers in the Attlee governments, 1945–1951
People from Wealden District
Barons created by George VI